Major General Sir Harold Reginald Kerr KBE CB MC (22 April 1897 – 1 November 1974) was a British Army officer who saw service during both World War I and World War II.

Military career
Born on 22 April 1897, Reginald Kerr was educated at Bedford School and at the Royal Military College, Sandhurst. He received his commission in the British Army in 1914, serving in the Army Service Corps (later the Royal Army Service Corps) in France and Flanders during World War I, gaining the Military Cross (MC) in 1918, and subsequently serving on the staff of the British Army of the Rhine in Germany until 1920.

Remaining in the army during the interwar period, Kerr married, in 1921, and was an instructor at Sandhurst from 1924 to 1928, before receiving an appointment as adjutant at the RASC Training Centre from 1929 to 1930. Then he attended the Staff College, Camberley, from 1931 to 1932, where he came into contact with future generals such as Brian Horrocks, Sidney Kirkman, Thomas Rees and Joseph Baillon and Frank Simpson, who were among his numerous fellow students. This was followed by a posting to the Sudan as a staff officer, in 1934, before returning to England where he again served as a staff officer, this time with the 3rd Division, from 1935 to 1936, and then was chief instructor at the RASC Training Centre, holding this position from 1937 to 1939. The outbreak of war found him back at the Staff College, Camberley, this time serving as an instructor.

During World War II he was on the British Army Staff in Washington, D.C., between June 1941 and November 1942, major general in charge of administration, Eastern Command, between December 1942 and May 1943, and Director of Supplies and Transport at the War Office, between 1943 and 1946. He was Major General in charge of Administration, Far East Land Forces, between 1946 and 1948, and retired from the British Army in 1949. He was Chairman of the British Waterways Board between 1955 and 1962.

Major General Sir Reginald Kerr was invested as a Companion of the Order of the Bath in 1945, and as a Knight Commander of the Order of the British Empire in 1946. He died in Lyme Regis, Dorset, on 1 November 1974.

References

Bibliography

External links
Generals of World War II

1897 births
1974 deaths
People educated at Bedford School
Graduates of the Royal Military College, Sandhurst
British Army personnel of World War I
Recipients of the Military Cross
Companions of the Order of the Bath
Knights Commander of the Order of the British Empire
Graduates of the Staff College, Camberley
Royal Army Service Corps officers
British Army generals of World War II
Academics of the Staff College, Camberley
Academics of the Royal Military College, Sandhurst
British Army major generals